Star Motorcycles was a U.S.-specific brand of Yamaha Motor Company used on Yamaha's cruiser motorcycles.

History
In 1994 Yamaha announced the creation of Star Motorcycles, a new standalone brand name for its cruiser series of motorcycles in the American market. Although a separate brand, Star motorcycles will continue to be sold at Yamaha dealerships. In other markets the same bikes will still be sold as Yamahas. In 2006 The brand was expanded to being its own company, although Yamaha still handles production and distribution. The brand is operated out of the Yamaha Motor Corporation, USA offices in Cypress, California.  The motorcycles are designed in the United States.

In 2016 Yamaha announced they will be dropping the moniker STAR, and reverting to selling under the Yamaha name.

Models
 Bolt
 Star Bolt
 Bolt R-Spec
 Royal Star
 Royal Star Tour Deluxe
 Royal Star Venture
 Stratoliner
 Stratoliner Delux
 Stratoliner
 Stratoliner S
 Roadliner / XV1900
 Roadliner / XV1900A
 Roadliner Midnight
 Midnight Star
 Roadliner S / XV1900AS
 Raider

 Road Star
 Road Star
 Road Star S
 Road Star Silverado
 Road Star Silverado S
 DragStar / V-Star / XVS
DragStar 125
DragStar 250 / V Star 250 XVS250
DragStar 400
DragStar 650 / V Star Classic XVS650A
DragStar 650 / V Star Custom XVS650
DragStar 650 / V Star Silverado
DragStar 950 / V Star 950
DragStar 950 Tourer / V Star 950 Tourer
DragStar 1100 / V Star 1100 Classic  XVS1100A
DragStar 1100 / V Star 1100 Custom  XVS1100
DragStar 1100 / V Star 1100 Silverado
 V Star 1300 / XVS1300A
 V Star 1300 / XVS1300AW(C)
 V Star 1300 Tourer
 Stryker
 Warrior
 Midnight Warrior
 Warrior
 V-Max

External links
 Star Motorcycles Official site (Redirects to https://www.yamahamotorsports.com/motorcycle)

Yamaha motorcycles
Lists of motorcycles by brand
Companies based in Los Angeles County, California
1984 establishments in California
Yamaha products